Ankrah is a surname. Notable people with the surname include:

Elvis Afriyie Ankrah (born 1967), Ghanaian politician
Jason Ankrah (born 1991), American football player
Joseph Arthur Ankrah (1915–1992), Ghanaian soldier
Roy Ankrah (1925–1995), Ghanaian boxer
Sam Korankye Ankrah (born 1960), Ghanaian theologian

See also
Holly Quin-Ankrah (born 1987), British actress